Chalo Chatu translated as our world in the Zambian language is an English-language wiki-based free encyclopaedia project created by Jason Mulikita that is dedicated to documenting the Zambia and also try to preserve the history and pride of Zambia covering historical events and current events, notable public figures, companies, organizations, websites, national monuments and other notable key features of Zambia. The site uses MediaWiki software to maintain a user-created database of information. The site's content is under a Creative Commons license(CC BY-SA 3.0) which means that it is available free to the public, but cannot be used for commercial purposes and should not be modified by people who are not part of the community of the website. Chalo Chatu is a work-in-progress, with articles in various stages of completion.

History
The web site was opened on 1 June 2016 and has been active since then. The website was launched with the ".org" top-level domain denoting its non-commercial nature.

Funding & Nature of the project 
Chalo Chatu Foundation is documenting an entire nation which no easy task according to the site itself. The main aim of the project is to document everything that has to-do with Zambia. The stated aim of the project is "preserving the History and Pride of Zambia ". Chalo Chatu is a non-profit so it gets fundings through the donations that people make. The organization that runs the project does not have its own equipment and is constantly relying on individual volunteers to use their own equipment, such as computers and cameras, to gather information.

References

External links 

 Website

Wikis
Open content projects
Creative Commons-licensed websites
Online encyclopedias
Internet properties established in 2016
MediaWiki websites
Zambian online encyclopedias
History of Zambia